The GNU Linear Programming Kit (GLPK) is a software package intended for solving large-scale linear programming (LP), mixed integer programming (MIP), and other related problems. It is a set of routines written in ANSI C and organized in the form of a callable library. The package is part of the GNU Project and is released under the GNU General Public License.

GLPK uses the revised simplex method and the primal-dual interior point method for non-integer problems and the branch-and-bound algorithm together with Gomory's mixed integer cuts for (mixed) integer problems.

History 
GLPK was developed by Andrew O. Makhorin (Андрей Олегович Махорин) of the Moscow Aviation Institute. The first public release was in October 2000.
 Version 1.1.1 contained a library for a revised primal and dual simplex algorithm.
 Version 2.0 introduced an implementation of the primal-dual interior point method.
 Version 2.2 added branch and bound solving of mixed integer problems.
 Version 2.4 added a first implementation of the GLPK/L modeling language.
 Version 4.0 replaced GLPK/L by the GNU MathProg modeling language, which is a subset of the AMPL modeling language.

Interfaces and wrappers 
Since version 4.0, GLPK problems can be modeled using GNU MathProg (GMPL), a subset of the AMPL modeling language used only by GLPK. However, GLPK is most commonly called from other programming languages. Wrappers exist for:

 Julia and the JuMP modeling package
 Java (using OptimJ)

Further reading 

  The book uses GLPK exclusively and contains numerous examples.

References

External links

 GLPK official site
 GLPK Wikibook

Linear Programming Kit
Mathematical optimization software
Free mathematics software
Free software programmed in C
Mathematics software for Linux